The Athletics at the 2016 Summer Paralympics – Men's 200 metres T44 event at the 2016 Paralympic Games took place on 11–12 September 2016, at the Estádio Olímpico João Havelange.

Heats

Heat 1 
20:03 11 September 2016:

Heat 2 
20:10 11 September 2016:

Final 
19:21 12 September 2016:

Notes

Athletics at the 2016 Summer Paralympics
2016 in men's athletics